Yana Urqu (Quechua yana black, urqu mountain, "black mountain", Hispanicized spelling Yanaorjo) is a mountain in the Andes of Peru, about  high. It is situated in the Cusco Region, Quispicanchi Province, Marcapata District. It lies southwest of Wanakuni and west of a little lake named Q'umirqucha.

References 

Mountains of Cusco Region
Mountains of Peru